Lepturges is a genus of longhorn beetles of the subfamily Lamiinae. It was described by Henry Walter Bates in 1863.

Species
 Lepturges abditus Monné, 1976
 Lepturges alboscriptus Bates, 1863
 Lepturges alvarengai Monné, 1976
 Lepturges amabilis Bates, 1863
 Lepturges anceps Gilmour, 1962
 Lepturges angulatus (LeConte, 1852)
 Lepturges angustatus Bates, 1863
 Lepturges beaveri Monné, 1978
 Lepturges breviceps (White, 1855)
 Lepturges bucki Melzer, 1930
 Lepturges callinus Bates, 1885
 Lepturges canocinctus Gilmour, 1962
 Lepturges castaneus Monné, 1978
 Lepturges centralis Monné, 1978
 Lepturges charicles Bates, 1885
 Lepturges cinereolus Monné, 1976
 Lepturges cingillus Monné, 1978
 Lepturges circumscripta (Bates, 1881)
 Lepturges citrinus Monné, 1976
 Lepturges comminus Monné, 1977
 Lepturges complanatus Bates, 1863
 Lepturges comptus Melzer, 1930
 Lepturges confluens (Haldeman, 1847)
 Lepturges curvilinea Gilmour, 1959
 Lepturges definitus Tavakilian & Monné, 1989
 Lepturges dorotheae Gilmour, 1962
 Lepturges dorsalis (White, 1855)
 Lepturges elegantulus Bates, 1863
 Lepturges elimata Monné, 1976
 Lepturges epagogus Monné, 1977
 Lepturges eurynota Tippmann, 1960
 Lepturges fasciculatoides Gilmour, 1962
 Lepturges festivus Bates, 1872
 Lepturges figuratus Pascoe, 1866
 Lepturges fischeri Melzer, 1928
 Lepturges fragillimus (Bates, 1863)
 Lepturges fuchsi Gilmour, 1962
 Lepturges funereus Monné, 1976
 Lepturges glaphyra Monné, 1976
 Lepturges gratiosus Bates, 1874
 Lepturges griseostriatus (Bates, 1863)
 Lepturges hahneli Gilmour, 1959
 Lepturges hylaeanus Monné, 1978
 Lepturges infilatus Bates, 1872
 Lepturges inscriptus (Bates, 1863)
 Lepturges insignis Melzer, 1928
 Lepturges itu Monné, 1976
 Lepturges janus Bates, 1881
 Lepturges laeteguttatus Bates, 1885
 Lepturges laetus Melzer, 1928
 Lepturges limpidus Bates, 1872
 Lepturges linearis Bates, 1863
 Lepturges macilentus Bates, 1881
 Lepturges maculosus Gilmour, 1959
 Lepturges malkini Monné, 1978
 Lepturges mattogrossis Gilmour, 1962
 Lepturges megalops Hamilton in Leng & Hamilton, 1896
 Lepturges multilineatus Melzer, 1928
 Lepturges navicularis Bates, 1872
 Lepturges perelegans Bates, 1863
 Lepturges peruibensis Monné, 1976
 Lepturges pictus (LeConte, 1852)
 Lepturges prolatus Monné, 1977
 Lepturges proximus Melzer, 1934
 Lepturges punctatissimus Monné, 1976
 Lepturges regularis (LeConte, 1852)
 Lepturges repandus Tavakilian & Monné, 1989
 Lepturges rhytisma Monné, 1976
 Lepturges roppai Monné, 1976
 Lepturges rotundus Monné, 1977
 Lepturges scitulus Tavakilian & Monné, 1989
 Lepturges scriptus Gilmour, 1958
 Lepturges seabrai Monné, 1976
 Lepturges sejunctimacula Bates, 1881
 Lepturges serenus Monné, 1977
 Lepturges serranus Monné, 1976
 Lepturges sexvittatus Bates, 1874
 Lepturges singularis Monné, 1976
 Lepturges spitzi Melzer, 1928
 Lepturges subglaber Casey, 1913
 Lepturges symmetricus (Haldeman, 1847)
 Lepturges tenuis Gilmour, 1962
 Lepturges umbrosus Monné, 1978
 Lepturges unicolor Gilmour, 1959
 Lepturges villiersi Gilmour, 1962
 Lepturges virgatus Monné, 1978
 Lepturges virgulti Gilmour, 1962
 Lepturges vogti Hovore & Tyson, 1983
 Lepturges yucca Schaeffer, 1905
 Lepturges zikani Melzer, 1928
 Lepturges zonula Monné, 1976

References

 
Acanthocinini